Mohammadiyeh (also Romanized as Moḩammadīyeh) is a village in Oshtorjan Rural District, in the Central District of Falavarjan County, Isfahan Province, Iran. At the 2006 census, its population was 1,358, in 337 families.

References 

Populated places in Falavarjan County